Daniel Davis House may refer to:

Daniel M. Davis House, Dahlonega, Georgia, listed on the NRHP in Lumpkin County, Georgia
Daniel Davis House (Paintsville, Kentucky), listed on the NRHP in Johnson County, Kentucky
Daniel Davis House and Barn, Birmingham, Pennsylvania, listed on the NRHP in southern Chester County, Pennsylvania

See also
Davis House (disambiguation)